The U.S. Routes in Georgia comprise the following current and former United States Numbered Highways in the U.S. state of Georgia.


U.S. Routes

Special routes

See also

References

External links
 Georgia Roads - The Unofficial Georgia State Highways Web Site
 The Unofficial Georgia Highways Web Page
 Georgia State Highway Ends

 
U.S. Highways